Nora is an unincorporated community in Latah County, in the U.S. state of Idaho.

History
Nora contained a post office from 1900 until 1906. The community was originally built up chiefly by Scandinavians.

References

Unincorporated communities in Latah County, Idaho
Unincorporated communities in Idaho